Benito Juárez is one of the eleven municipalities of the Mexican state of Quintana Roo.  Most of its population reside in the municipal seat, Cancún. It is named after the 19th century president and statesman Benito Juárez.

Geography 
Benito Juárez is located in the north of the state with the Caribbean Sea as its eastern border. It borders on the municipalities of Isla Mujeres to the north, Puerto Morelos to the south, and Lázaro Cárdenas to the west. The municipality covers an area  which is 3.72% of the territory of the state.

Communities
The 2010 census enumerated 295 populated localities and 272 unpopulated localities. The largest are as follows:

Puerto Juárez, the primary location of the original population of the area before the founding of the city of Cancún, was considered a separate location from 1960 until 1990, when it was abolished as such and incorporated as one of Cancún's districts.

History
The Mayan culture occupied the territory and they are still subsisting. In Cancún are different types of archeological monuments like "Ruinas de el Rey". At the time the town of Cancún was founded (1902) the majority of its business activity was the production and export gum and "palo de tinte". They transported it to Puerto Morelos for the translation to Cozumel and from there it was exported to other countries.

After World War II gum production dropped. In the 1960s, other commercial activities were started. In the 1960s the "island of Cancún" was only occupied at certain times of the year, however by 1974 the first hotel was opened in what is now known as the Hotel Zone.  This was also the year Quintana Roo that was recognized as a state.  At the time Benito Juarez was founded, it was part the Isla Mujeres territory and received municipality status one year later in 1975.

In 2016, the municipality of Puerto Morelos was split off from Benito Juárez.

Demographics

Economy 

The principal businesses in this municipality are hotels, restaurants, travel agencies and tourist transportation.

Economic activities:
 Primary……………….3.7% (agriculture, hunting, fishing)
 Secondary…………….6.0% (manufacturing, construction, electricity)
 Tertiary……………….90.3% (trade, tourism)

Local government

Mayors (Municipal Presidents):
 María Elena “Mara” Lezama Espinosa (MORENA) 2021-2024
 Clara Emilia Díaz Aguilar (MORENA) April-June 2021
 María Elena “Mara” Lezama Espinosa (MORENA) 2018-2021
 Remberto Estrada Barba (PVEM) 2016-2018
 Paul Michell Carrillo de Cáceres (PRI) 2013-2016
 Julián Javier Ricalde Magaña (PRD) 2011-2013
 Gregorio Sánchez Martínez (PRD) 2008-2010

References

External links 

 
 Official Cancún Website

Municipalities of Quintana Roo
Port cities and towns of the Mexican Gulf Coast